Geerdijk was a railway station in Geerdijk, The Netherlands. The station was opened on 1 October 1906 and is on the Mariënberg–Almelo railway. The station was on a single track line but had 2 platforms. This is because there is a level crossing in between. The train runs over the level crossing first and then stops on the platform. This is so that the level crossing doesn't have to be closed while the train waits.

The station was announced as the second-least used station in the Netherlands in 2005 with an average of 60 passengers a day. For this reason, the railway station was closed on 29 April 2016. This allows Arriva to extend the train service from Mariënberg to Hardenberg..

Platforms

 Platform 1a is the northern one, formerly offering the service to Mariënberg.
 Platform 1b is the southern one, formerly offering the service to Almelo.

External links
NS website 
Dutch Public Transport journey planner 

Railway stations in Overijssel
Railway stations opened in 1906
Twenterand
1906 establishments in the Netherlands
Railway stations in the Netherlands opened in the 20th century